is a Japanese singer-songwriter, radio personality, philanthropist and goodwill ambassador for Bandai Plateau in Kita-Shiobara Village, Yama District, Fukushima. She is originally from Nakagusuku village, in Nakagami county, Okinawa, Japan.

Biography 
Kaori Futenma was born into a bloodline of the royal family of the Ryūkyū Kingdom. She started her singing career at the age of 3 and used to be acclaimed in local music competitions in Okinawa. In 1991, Futenma signed with King Records and rose to prominence singing mostly anime songs under her stage name "Kaori Honma," but 6 years later changed her stage name to the real one to pursue a career as a singer-songwriter. In 1999 she signed with Teichiku records and since then CDs have been released by the label. In most of songs she penned she expresses her emotions about her home, Okinawa, on the lyrics.

In addition to her career as a singer, she performs as the host of radio shows e.g. she podcasts a show "Kaori Futenma's Summer Wind Letters (Japanese:普天間かおりの真南風便り|Futenma Kaori no Mafē Dayori)" on Radio Fukushima. Futenma appears on radio shows and TV commercials mainly on local broadcast stations in Fukushima.

On 11 March 2011, she encountered the 2011 Tōhoku earthquake while performing on a live radio show on Radio Fukushima. In the wake of the disasters, she founded a project called "Smile Again 0311" to benefit victims and started performing charity concerts for people who live in evacuation shelters and conducting benefit concerts to raise funds, also, penned a charity song called "Smile Again" and released it on the Internet and donated proceeds to those who suffered the disasters. Additionally, Futenma's since participated in another project called "Smile Books(Japanese:スマイル文庫|sumairu bunko)" hand in hand with local people and champions for the project in Jinbōchō, Tokyo, the most famous bookstore street in Japan—the aim of the project is book donation to children in Fukushima—she also tours round evacuation shelters and reads books and performs concerts for them as a member of the project. On this activity, she gains support for the project and builds bridges between philanthropists from various different fields.

Discography

Singles

Albums

Filmography

TV 
Kaori Futenma
 "Tokimeki Wide" / 4 February 2000 / NHK
 "Beauty Tsūshin" / 1 July 2001 / BS Japan
 "Studio Park" / 24 August 2001 / NHK
 "NHK Kayō Concert" / 23 November 2001, 22 January and 10 December 2002 / NHK
 "Music Tide" / 22 September 2003 / BS-i
 "Jojōka Dai-zenshu 2010" / 30 October 2010 / NHK-BS2
 "Ongaku no Hi" / 29 June 2013 / TBS

Radio 
Kaori Honma
 "Kaori no Hello! Ani Pop" (in Japanese) / October 1990 – September 1997 / Tokai Radio Broadcasting

Kaori Futenma
 "Kattobi Wide" / Radio Fukushima
 "Futenma Kaori no Ahaha de Ufufu" / Tōkai Radio Broadcasting, Ryūkyū Hōsō
 "Chura-Sunday" / Radio Fukushima
 "Kaori no Let's Night" / Radio Fukushima
 "Kenji to Kaori no Friend Radio" / Radio Fukushima

References

External links 
 

Japanese women singer-songwriters
Japanese radio personalities
1973 births
People from Okinawa Prefecture
Living people
20th-century Japanese women singers
20th-century Japanese singers
21st-century Japanese women singers
21st-century Japanese singers